Michael Emanuel may refer to:
 Michale Graves (born 1975), American singer-songwriter born Michael Emanuel
 Michael Emanuel (director), director of horror films including Scary or Die

See also